The 2013–14 LNH Division 1 is the 62nd season of the LNH Division 1, France's premier Handball league.

Team information 

The following 14 clubs compete in the LNH Division 1 during the 2013–14 season:

Personnel and kits
Following is the list of clubs competing in 2013–14 LNH Division 1, with their manager, captain, kit manufacturer and shirt sponsor.

League table 

Pld - Played; W - Won; L - Lost; PF - Points for; PA - Points against; Diff - Difference; Pts - Points.
(C) = Champion; (R) = Relegated; (P) = Promoted; (E) = Eliminated; (O) = Play-off winner; (A) = Advances to a further round.

Team roster
1 Vincent Gérard, 3 Benjamin Afgour, 4 Bastien Lamon, 6 Kornél Nagy, 7 Jaleleddine Touati, 9 Théophile Caussé, 10 Erwan Siakam-Kadji, 15 Pierre Soudry, 16 William Annotel, 17 Julian Emonet, 19 Romain Guillard, 21 Mickaël Grocaut, 26 Guillaume Joli, 46 Mohamed Mokrani 57 Baptiste Butto and 89 Espen Lie Hansen

Head coach: Patrick Cazal

Schedule and results
In the table below the home teams are listed on the left and the away teams along the top.

Statistics

Top goalscorers

Source:

Number of teams by regions

References

External links
 Official site 

2013–14 domestic handball leagues